The Dugger Formation is a geologic formation in Indiana.

References

Geology of Indiana